Balbodh Higher Secondary School (established in 1998 in Kanchan Rup Municipality, Saptari, Nepal) is government affiliated +2 Level, Higher Secondary Boarding School.

References

See also
List of educational institutions in Kanchan Rup

Saptari District
Educational institutions established in 1998
Secondary schools in Nepal
Boarding schools in Nepal
Universities and colleges in Nepal
1998 establishments in Nepal